H. LaVerne Westfall was an American tennis player active in the early 20th century.

Tennis career
Westfall reached the quarterfinals of the U.S. National Championships in 1907, also making the fourth round the following year.

Grand Slam tournament performance timeline

External links 

American male tennis players
Year of birth missing
Year of death missing